Folkington Reservoir is a  biological Site of Special Scientific Interest south-west of Polegate in East Sussex.

The banks of the reservoir support a rich chalk grassland flora including kidney vetch, horseshoe vetch, pyramidal orchid, fragrant orchid and the rare and protected hairy mallow. The reservoir itself is covered and the bare chalk on top supports ruderal species such as scarlet pimpernel and parsley piert.

References

Sites of Special Scientific Interest in East Sussex